P210 may refer to:
 SIG P210, a Swiss-designed Pistol
 Pressurised versions of the Cessna 210 light aircraft
 Estate version of the Volvo PV444/544 (Volvo Duett)